Vladimir Aleksandrovich Karelin (February 23, 1891 – September 22, 1938) was a Russian revolutionary, one of the organizers of the Left Socialist Revolutionary Party and a member of its Central Committee, People's Commissar of Property of the Russian Socialist Federative Soviet Republic from December 1917 to March 1918.

Biography
From a noble family, his father was an employee. He joined the Socialist Revolutionary Party in 1907. He graduated from two courses of the Law Faculty of Moscow University. He was under police surveillance, spent a year in prison and 5 years in exile. In 1913–1914, he was an employee of the newspaper "Smolensky Vestnik", and in 1915–1916 – the Kharkov newspaper "Morning". After the February Revolution of 1917, one of the leaders of the organization of the Party of Socialist Revolutionaries of Kharkov. In July 1917, the Chairman of the Kharkov City Duma. Participant of the Democratic Conference, then was a member of the Council of Elders of the Pre–Parliament.

After the October Revolution, he was a supporter of the creation of a homogeneous socialist government with the participation of Mensheviks and Socialist Revolutionaries.

At the Second All–Russian Congress of Soviets, he was elected to the Presidium of the All–Russian Central Executive Committee from the left Socialist Revolutionaries. At the founding congress of the Left Socialist Revolutionary Party (November 19–27), he was elected a member of the Central Committee. One of the 7 left Socialist Revolutionaries who joined the Council of People's Commissars of the Russian Socialist Federative Soviet Republic in December 1917. He took the post of People's Commissar of the Property of the Russian Socialist Federative Soviet Republic in the government, was a member of the collegium of the People's Commissariat of Justice. He was elected a deputy of the Constituent Assembly from the Kharkov Electoral District. In January 1918, he participated as a member of the delegation in the peace negotiations in Brest–Litovsk. In March 1918, due to disagreement with the signing of the Brest Peace, he resigned from the Council of People's Commissars.

He continued to remain a member of the All–Russian Central Executive Committee, defending the position of the left Socialist Revolutionaries at meetings. In the second half of March, he went to the South of Russia and Ukraine to agitate against the Brest Peace. In the spring and summer of 1918, he was a candidate for the Bureau For the Leadership Of the Insurrectionary Struggle, the "Insurrectionary Nine", formed by the Ukrainian Central Executive Committee.

He was one of the organizers and an active participant in the uprising of the Left Socialist Revolutionaries on July 6–7, 1918 in Moscow. After the defeat of the uprising, he went into an illegal position, in December 1918, he left for Ukraine. Sentenced in absentia to 3 years in prison. In February 1919, in Kharkov, he was arrested by the Extraordinary Commission, taken to Moscow, and released in October of the same year. Later he abandoned the struggle against the Bolsheviks. Since 1921, he worked as a lawyer in various institutions of Kharkov.

In 1937, he was a legal adviser to Gidrostroy (Kharkov). He was arrested on September 26, 1937, in March 1938 he was involved as a witness at the trial of the "Right Trotskyist Anti–Soviet Bloc". He testified about the alleged conspiracy in 1918 of Bukharin as the leader of the left communists, with the leaders of the left socialist revolutionaries with the aim of seizing power. On September 22, 1938, Karelin was sentenced by the Military Collegium of the Supreme Court of the Soviet Union to capital punishment and was shot on the same day. Rehabilitated in 1993.

References

Sources
Anatoly Razgon. Forgotten Names // First Soviet Government. Moscow: Publishing House of Political Literature of the Central Committee of the Communist Party of the Soviet Union, 1991. Pages 448–459
Lev Protasov. People of the Constituent Assembly: A Portrait in the Interior of the Era. Moscow, Russian Political Encyclopedia, 2008
Political Figures of Russia in 1917. Biographical Dictionary. Moscow: 1993

External links
Biographies on the Site "Chronos"
Vladimir Karelin. Biographical Dictionary. Internet Project "Archive of Alexander Yakovlev"

1891 births
1938 deaths
Russian revolutionaries
Socialist Revolutionary Party politicians
Left socialist-revolutionaries
Russian Constituent Assembly members
People executed by the Soviet Union by firearm